Shock Wave is a steel roller coaster located at Six Flags Over Texas in Arlington, Texas. Built right at the edge of the park, Shock Wave is easily seen by passers-by on Interstate Highway 30. Its unique four-sided tube truss track system is similar to The Riddler Mindbender roller coaster at Six Flags Over Georgia which was constructed at the same time.

History
On October 28, 1977, Six Flags Over Texas announced that Shock Wave would be coming to the park. The ride would be a looping coaster manufactured by Anton Schwarzkopf.

Shock Wave opened to the public on April 22, 1978. At the time of its opening, it was the tallest roller coaster in the world. It lost this title within weeks upon the opening of The Loch Ness Monster at Busch Gardens Williamsburg.

The ride is built on Johnson Creek real estate and had to temporarily close in the 2004 season because of a flood. Shock Wave was temporarily closed again in early 2008 for an extensive remodeling.

Six Flags announced on March 3, 2016, that Shock Wave would be among several rides at various parks that would receive a virtual reality (VR) upgrade. Riders had the option to wear Samsung Gear VR headsets, powered by Oculus, to create a 360-degree, 3D experience while riding. The virtual reality experience was called, The New Revolution, themed to a fighter jet, has riders flying through a futuristic city as co-pilots battling alien invaders. The feature debuted with the coaster when it reopened in spring of 2016. For the park's annual Fright Fest, the virtual reality ride became Rage of the Gargoyles.

In 2017, Six Flags discontinued the VR experience on Shockwave. References to the VR experience have since been removed from the ride's information page on Six Flags' official website.

Ride experience

The ride starts by passing through the transfer table and up the  lift hill. A slight dip into a right-hand U-turn leads into the first drop. The ride then negotiates two back-to-back vertical loops, and then travels up a hill into a small mid-course brake run. At this point, the ride turns right into a second U-Turn and dives down the second drop. Then quickly up a hill leading into a third U-turn to the left, over and around the ride's station. Then quickly travels down the third and final large drop. This is followed by a climb into a hill leading into a small left turn. Which leads into a long bunny hop over the creek. The ride then transitions into a 200° right turn leading into the brake run before returning to the station. The ride passes over Johnson Creek a total of four times.

Colors
Throughout the years, Shock Wave has undergone several re-paintings with different color schemes. When it first opened, the attraction's track and supports were all-white. The solid white color lasted only two years as it quickly became dirty. The second color scheme, introduced in 1980, featured dark blue track and supports. Since then, the ride has been repainted light blue, then silver with navy blue supports. During Time-Warner's ownership of the park the ride was painted with white track, yellow supports and pink loops. The operators jokingly referred to the ride as "fruit loops." The seventh color scheme of blue track with red supports came about in 1996. 2001 marked the 40th anniversary of the park and Shock Wave once again was given a new coat of paint — this time royal blue supports with a bright green track. That paint job remained on the coaster until 2012, when Shock Wave was finally given a much-needed new coat of paint. Similar to the previous color scheme, the present colors are royal blue supports, with a slightly brighter shade of green track.

Awards

References 

Roller coasters introduced in 1978
Roller coasters operated by Six Flags
Roller coasters in Texas
Six Flags Over Texas